The LRTA 2000 class, also known by the Light Rail Transit Authority as the Rotem/Toshiba Megatren Model 2003, is a class of electric multiple units of the Light Rail Transit Authority (LRTA) in Metro Manila, Philippines, which began operation in 2003. It is used in Line 2.

Purchase 
In line with the construction of Line 2, 72 cars (18 sets) were produced by Hyundai Rotem between 2002 and 2003. The trains were built in Uiwang, Gyeonggi-do, South Korea. The carbody was made by Hyundai Rotem, and the electric components were made by Toshiba. The trains were provided by the Asia-Europe MRT Consortium (AEMC), a consortium of Marubeni Corporation, Balfour Beatty, Toshiba, Daewoo Heavy Industries, and D.M. Consuji Incorporated (DMCI). The AEMC signed the Package 4 contract in 2000, in which includes the communications and fares systems, vehicles, and trackworks. The first batch of trains consisting of 4 sets (16 cars) arrived in November 2002, while the remaining 14 sets were delivered in the next months.

Design

Car body 
The car body is made of stainless steel, and the under frame shares the similar material with LAHT steel.

The trains sport a livery of yellow and purple cheatlines. The upper yellow lines represent mango, the unofficial national fruit. The thicker purple lines are based from the ube, and it sports a geometric ethnic design.

The trains have round front ends, which bears resemblance to the 2nd-generation trains of Seoul Metro Line 1, Line 4, and Bundang Line; these EMUs are also manufactured by Rotem (or then KOROS).

In total, there are eight air-conditioning units in a single train set.

Trains prominently use wrap advertising.

Interior 
The inner train space is lined with melamine and/or polyester faced ply metal. The windows are tinted safety glass, and the longitudinal seats are made of fiberglass reinforced plastics. The flooring is of stainless steel keystone plate and a thick, nonslip covering.

In 2017, some trains were retrofitted with the Passenger Assist Railway Display System (now known as TUBE), a passenger information system powered by LCD screens installed near the inner ceiling of the trains that shows news, advertisements, current train location, arrivals and station layouts. However, as of 2022, the LCD screens remain switched off and unutilized.

Mechanical 
The primary suspension consists of an elastomeric spring  and the secondary suspension is a diaphragm air spring.

Mechanical Shibata couplers are present at the ends of the driver cabs, along with anti-climbers above it. Semi-permanent couplers are present in between cars (non-cab ends).

Traction and auxiliaries 
The traction system consists of VVVF inverters controlled by IGBT semiconductors. The original VVVF controller and propulsion system is supplied by Toshiba, while the new VVVF controller and propulsion system done during the refurbishment period of three train sets is supplied by Woojin Industrial Systems.

The auxiliaries consist of 3,300 V static inverters and 110 V DC batteries.

Formation
The configuration of a four-car trainset is Mc–M–M–Mc.

Details of the car designations are listed below:
Mc - motor car with driver cab
M - motor intermediate car

Operations 
The trains have been in use since the opening of the LRT Line 2 in 2003. However, by 2014, 12 out of the 18 sets remained in service. By May 2019, the number of operational trains were reduced to 8 sets following a collision incident involving two train sets, and by October 2019, the number of operational trains in the line were reduced to 5 due to power supply limitations following a power trip incident. By July 2021, operational trains were increased to six after the Line 2 East Extension opened, with five trains used in the original line and one train as a shuttle train along the east extension stations as the signalling integration works of the east extension stations to the railway's existing systems were not completed at that time. By September 3 of the same year, these have increased to 8 sets after the completion of signalling integration works of the east extension stations to the railway's existing systems. Currently, eight trains are operational, while the other trains are being repaired/overhauled or awaiting spare parts.

Train upgrades and refurbishments
On April 16, 2018, the Light Rail Transit Authority signed a contract with Multi-Scan Corporation and MRail, Inc. for the replacement of 80 air-conditioning units in 10 train sets. It used parts from the original equipment manufacturer of the air-conditioning units, Carrier Corporation. The replacement of air-conditioning units started on March 7, 2019 and was completed on May 24.

Rehabilitation of three train sets started on March 3, 2021. The current maintenance provider of LRT Line 2, a joint venture of Autre Porte Technique Global Inc., Multi-Scan Corporation, and Opus Land Inc., started the installation of new train propulsion systems and train monitoring systems from manufacturer Woojin Industrial Systems in three trains in order for those trains to return to service ahead of the original scheduled opening of the east extension in April 2021. Trainsets 09, 14, and 17 were the train sets refurbished. The refurbishment was completed in the same year.

A contract to upgrade the trains' propulsion system to replace the Toshiba VVVF system is currently in the procurement stage since June 2022.

Incidents 
 On May 18, 2019, trainset no. 13 broke down at Katipunan station at 2:09 PM after the train's static inverters, which powers the electrical and braking systems in the trains, suffered a failure. The train was subsequently moved to the pocket track near Anonas station, waiting to be towed back to the depot. However at 9:15 PM, the train was reported to have moved on its own towards the eastbound track going towards Santolan station. This was due to the air pressure slowly dissipating according to a fact-finding committee report, causing the brake shoes of train no. 13 to be loosened. In addition, both sides of the Anonas pocket track area slope downward, causing the train to move on its own. At this time, trainset no. 18 was going towards Santolan station from Cubao station on the same track. The runaway train was reported via radio but eventually ran into train No. 13, injuring 34 passengers, with none in critical condition. The driver of one of the two trains was reported to have jumped out of his train before the collision, sustaining wounds and bruises. Revenue operations were suspended to give way to maintenance checks, and normal operations resumed at 10:47 AM the next day. Both trains involved were subsequently repaired and returned to service in 2021.

See also 

 Korail Class 311000
 Korail Class 341000
 Korail Class 351000
 LRTA 1100 class
 PNR Hyundai Rotem DMU

Notes

References

Sources 
 
 

 

Manila Light Rail Transit System
Rolling stock of the Philippines
Train-related introductions in 2003
1500 V DC multiple units
Hyundai Rotem multiple units